Matthias Lutolf (born in 1973, also known as Matthias Lütolf) is a bio-engineer and a professor at EPFL (École Polytechnique Fédérale de Lausanne) where he leads the Laboratory of Stem Cell Bioengineering. He is specialised in biomaterials, and in combining stem cell biology and engineering to develop improved organoid models. In 2021, he became the scientific director for  Roche's Institute for Translation Bioengineering in Basel.

Career 
Lutolf studied materials engineering at ETH Zurich where he graduated in 1998. In 2002, he received his PhD in biomedical engineering from ETH Zurich for his studies on cell-responsive hydrogels for tissue engineering and cell culture, in the group of Jeffrey Hubbell. He completed postdoctoral studies in the laboratory of Helen Blau at Stanford University, where he worked on novel cell culture approaches for blood and muscle stem cells, so called synthetic niches. In 2007, he founded his own laboratory at EPFL, where he was promoted to associate professor in 2014 and full professor in 2018. From 2014 to 2018, he was director of  EPFL's Institute of Bioengineering. In June 2021, Lutolf became scientific director of the newly established Roche Institute for Translational Bioengineering in Basel, Switzerland.

Research 
Lutolf's laboratory develops in vitro organoids mimicking healthy and diseased tissues and organs. Specifically, Lutolf uses  bioengineering strategies to guide stem cell-based development to build novel organoids with improved reproducibility and physiological relevance for basic science and in vitro testing of drug candidates. His team has developed approaches to generate organoids in fully controllable 3D matrices, and has contributed to the understanding of how extrinsic biochemical and physical factors control stem cell fate and organogenesis. His team has developed concepts based on microfabrication, bioprinting, and microfluidics to improve the reproducibility, size, shape, and function of organoids.

Distinctions 
In 2007, Lutolf received the European Young Investigator (EURYI) Award by the European Science Foundation. Since 2018, he is elected as member of the European Molecular Biology Organization (EMBO). He serves as associate editor of The Company of Biologists' journal Development.

Publications

External links 

 
 Website of the Laboratory of Stem Cell Bioengineering

References 

Academic staff of the École Polytechnique Fédérale de Lausanne
ETH Zurich alumni
Stanford University people
Swiss biologists
Living people
1973 births
Bioengineers